Go West is the fourth studio album by the Village People, released on March 26, 1979. It features their hit singles "In the Navy" (#3 on the US Billboard Hot 100, #2 in the UK Top 40)  and "Go West", which the Pet Shop Boys did a successful cover of in 1993.

The album was reissued on CD in 1996.

Go West would be the band's last complete album of all-new material for Casablanca, as well as the last album to feature Victor Willis.

Critical reception
Billboard Magazine stated that the album contains "some of the most irresistible rhythm in today's pop /disco genre."  Billboard described the song "I Wanna Shake Your Hand" as "an appropriately non romantic twist on the Beatles", with its mock exhortation to "Don't be shy/ go up and say hello."  AllMusic critic Amy Hanson felt that aside from the two singles and "Manhattan Woman," which she felt "contained some interesting, James Brown-inflected vocalizations," the remaining songs "sound like a rehash of the band's already released finest."

Track listing

Charts

Weekly charts

Certifications and sales

References

1979 albums
Village People albums
Casablanca Records albums
Albums produced by Jacques Morali